"When It's Down to Me and You" is a song written by Stephen Allen Davis and Dennis Morgan, and recorded by American country music artists Charly McClain and Wayne Massey.  It was released in March 1986 as the first single from the album When Love Is Right.  The song reached #17 on the Billboard Hot Country Singles & Tracks chart.

Chart performance

References

1986 singles
1986 songs
Charly McClain songs
Songs written by Dennis Morgan (songwriter)
Song recordings produced by Norro Wilson
Epic Records singles
Songs written by Stephen Allen Davis